Gratian can refer to:
 Felinus and Gratian (d. 250 AD), Christian martyrs and saints
 Gratianus Funarius, Roman soldier, father of emperors Valentinian I and Valens
 Gratian, Roman emperor from 367 to 383
 Gratian, a 5th-century Romano-British usurper and emperor
 Pope Gregory VI (died 1047), whose name was John Gratian before he assumed the papacy
 the author of the 12th-century Decretum Gratiani
 Gratian of Tours (Gatian), bishop of Tours